is a Japanese adult visual novel developed by Windmill released on October 21, 2005 for Windows PCs. The game was later ported to the PlayStation 2. An adult fan disc titled Happiness! Re:Lucks was developed by Windmill's sister brand Windmill Oasis and released on July 28, 2006 for Windows. A manga illustrated by Rino Fujii was serialized in Media Factory's Monthly Comic Alive between 2006 and 2007. A series of novels were published by Harvest between 2006 and 2008. A 12-episode anime produced by Artland aired in Japan between October and December 2006, and an original video animation episode followed in January 2007.

Plot
Happiness! centers around Yūma Kohinata, a high school student attending Mizuhosaka Academy's regular section of the school, and his close friends Jun Watarase and Hachisuke Takamizo. The other section of the school, aptly named the magic section, was founded in order to train mages in the art of using magic. The day after Valentine's Day, a gas explosion at the magic section causes all the mages in training to transfer to the normal section for the time being. Two girls from the magic section, Haruhi Kamisaka and Anri Hiiragi, are placed in Yūma's class. Now Haruhi and her friends must adjust to the transfer into the normal section of Mizuhosaka Academy.

Characters

 (anime)
Yūma is the main protagonist in the story. He has a nice, helping personality and is not afraid to help girls in need. His two close friends are Hachisuke Takamizo, and Jun Watarase, who seems to have a crush on him. When he was younger he was able to do some magic in order to help Haruhi who was being bullied, but now he professes that he cannot use magic (though in reality he still can). Additionally, he seems to be put off by the notion of using magic whatsoever, even if it is able to help people. Eventually, he realizes that magic can bring happiness if used in the right way and transfers to the magic section. In the end, he learned that his real mother is Suzuri Minagi (a teacher in the magic section). He is actually one of a kind and one of the most powerful and quickest of learners when it comes to magic, although he doesn't use it because of a few accidents when he was younger and because his mother erased his memory when he was young. He eventually started to harbour feelings for Haruhi Kamisaka.

Haruhi is the main heroine in the story. She is a mage in training and is seen as very skilled amongst her peers, who have been known to think of her as a genius when it comes to using magic. When she was younger, Yūma was able to use some magic in order to help her from some bullies which made her want to become a mage herself. Her magic wand is named , which owes its form from a trumpet that Haruhi used to play before she started to study magic. She harbours feelings for Yuma Kohinata. She was mistaken by Ibuki Shikimori to be the daughter of "that" woman (the woman who stole the Shikimori treasure) and even tried to control her to break the barrier that seals the treasure in the Shikimori Forest. In the end, she got together with Yuma when he was transferred to the Magic Section.

Anri is Haruhi's close friend and also a fellow mage in training. She tends to have a very strong-willed type of personality which she uses to try to get the things she wants. It can also make her reckless when it comes to her using magic, due to her being overconfident and underskilled compared to Haruhi. She is left handed according to the seventh anime episode. Her magic wand is named  and was formed from her favorite feathered pen. She applied for a part-time job as a waitress in the Oasis cafeteria to save some money for her to be able to go abroad and study at a Magic Institution. Eventually, she begins working for Otoha Kohinata in the school's cafeteria.

Koyuki is a friend of Haruhi and Anri who is one year above them and is also in the magic section. Her magic wand is named  though it is also known to be nicknamed . It takes the form of a staff with a small green sphere on the end that floats on the staff. Unlike the other magic wands featured that can speak spiritually, sphere Tom has a face from which to voice its opinions. Koyuki inherited the craft of making "Tama-chan"s and puts a lot of effort not only into their creation but going as far as to remember the order in which she made each one despite them appearing all to be relatively similar in appearance. As this dedication to magic has shown, she seems to be very skilled in her use of magic, especially divination magic or fortune telling.

 (PC), Oma Ichimura (PS2/anime)
Ibuki is a young girl and powerful mage who transfers into Sumomo's class. Most of the time, she is very standoffish and will push people away from her either figuratively or literally, so as to be left alone. Her family is known for being well-advanced in terms of magic, and even at such a young age Ibuki has shown herself to be well skilled as she uses her magic wand named , which takes the form of an umbrella. The Kamijō family has been serving the Shikimori family for generations. This explains why Saya and Shinya Kamijō are always with Ibuki and act as her protectors and followers. She wanted to retrieve the Shikimori treasure for a reason that she wanted to see her sister, Natsumi, who died from sealing the angel demons that came out of the treasure. She mistakenly thought that Haruhi, because of her great skills in using magic, is the daughter of the woman who stole and hid the treasure.

 (PC), Shizuka Itō (PS2/anime)
Saya is a young girl who transfers into Yūma's class along with her twin brother Shinya, who is also a mage. She was initially mistaken for a ghost by Hachisuke after he met up with her one night by chance at school. Her magic wand is named  and takes the form of a violin bow. They have been serving the Shikimori family for generations. They never knew their mother because she is already dead. The reason is unknown. Their, she and her brother Shinya, wanting to see and meet their mother, urged their father to steal the Shikimori treasure for it was believed to have powers that can bring back the spirit of the dead but it turned into chaos. The treasure was provoked and unleashed the angel demons contained in it. Thus, it must be sealed again. Suzura Minagi, Natsumi Shikimori and Takamine's mother tried to stop it. This however, ends up with Natsumi sacrificing her life to seal it and stop the demons, much to Ibuki's sorrow.

 (PC), Mai Goto (PS2/anime)
Sumomo is Yūma's younger sister who seems to have an energetic personality. She has known Haruhi since childhood and they used to play together. Due to family circumstances, Sumomo didn't become Yūma's sister until after she had entered elementary school. She has amazing skills in cooking.

 (PC), Takuo Kawamura (PS2/anime)
Hachisuke, otherwise known simply as Hachi, is one of Yūma's close friends and hangs out with him and Jun Watarase constantly. He seems to be desperate for any affection from girls, as the closest chance he has at getting a girl is with his friend Jun, who, despite his feminine appearance, is in fact male. He is often very perverted as well.

 (PC), Michiru Yuimoto (PS2/anime)
Jun is another of Yūma's close friends. Despite being born male, Jun has a feminine appearance and wears women's clothes. Due to this, girls at Jun's school treat Jun as a girl, and they even allow Jun to change clothes with them. Jun enjoys the attention received from male students. Jun is attracted to men, and has a desire to date Yūma, but Yūma spurns Jun's multiple advances. Jun adores hanging around girls as friends. Jun's signature attack, the Patriot Missile Kick, is a flying side kick, normally used as a means to keep Hachi under control.

 (PC), Chizuko Hoshino (PS2/anime)
Otoha is the unorthodox mother of Yūma and Sumomo. She runs the school cafeteria called Oasis. Otoha often does not act her age, but rather she acts closer to her daughter's age. She is close friends with Suzura Minagi. This is why Suzuri entrusts her to take care of Yuma.

 (PC), Kentarō Itō (PS2/anime)
He is the twin brother of Saya Kamijyo. His family has served Shikimori for every generations. He has a wooden, katana-like magic wand though the name is unknown. One of his defining traits is that he has a horrible sense of direction where he even gets lost walking to school with his sister as they manage to get separated constantly. However, if Saya is in any danger, he instantly knows where she is and runs to her in seconds.

She is the biological mother of Yūma Kohinata. She is a teacher in the magical section. She was forced to entrust her son, Yuma, to her close friend, Otoha, because of many tragic things that had happened. She erased Yuma's memory of her before going separate ways. She revealed the whole story to Haruhi and Anri of what had happened in the past.

Development and release
Happiness! is the sixth title developed by the visual novel developer Windmill. The project's planning was headed by Kocha and Chatora, who also served as the director. The scenario was written by four people: Chatora, Celery, Kei Watanabe and Ayaka. The art director and character design was provided by Kocha, and the super deformed illustrations were done by Yui Haga. The music in the game was composed by members of Elements Garden and OdiakeS under the name Ecnemuse.

Happiness! was released in Japan on October 21, 2005 as a limited edition version, playable only on Windows PCs as a DVD; the regular edition was released on November 18, 2005. The limited edition came bundled with an illustration booklet and the game's original soundtrack. A fan disc titled Happiness! Re:Lucks was released on July 28, 2006 as a limited edition version playable on a Windows PC as a DVD; the regular edition was released on September 15, 2006. Developed by Windmill's sister brand Windmill Oasis, the staff for Re:Lucks was largely the same as the original game, except for the scenario staff, which was divided between Chatora, Celery, Eiji Takashima, Hare Kitagawa and Kei Hozumi. Happiness! was ported to the PlayStation 2 by Marvelous Interactive under the title Happiness! De:Luxe on January 25, 2007.

Adaptations

Novels
Harvest published seven novels based on Happiness! from April 2006 to July 2008. The first two were written by Nikaidō Kageyama, the next four were written by Satoshi Mikado, and the last was written by Mutsuki Mizusaki.

Manga
A manga adaptation, illustrated by Rino Fujii, was serialized in Media Factory's Monthly Comic Alive magazine between the August 2006 and June 2007 issues. Two tankōbon volumes were released: the first on December 22, 2006 and the second on May 23, 2007.

Anime
A 12-episode anime adaptation written by Satoru Nishizono, directed by Hiroshi Hara, and produced by Artland, aired on Japan television between October 5 and December 21, 2006. On January 25, 2007, an original video animation (OVA) episode was released with the first print limited edition of Happiness! De:Luxe. Two pieces of theme music are used for the anime: one opening theme and one ending theme. The opening theme is "Happiness!" by Ayumi Murata, and the ending theme is "Magical Generation" by Yui Sakakibara. The anime's original soundtrack was released on November 22, 2006 in Japan, published by Media Factory. It was released on DVD in Japan from December 5, 2006 to May 25, 2007. Maiden Japan licensed the series and released the complete series on DVD on April 1, 2014.

Music
The opening theme of the Happiness! visual novel is "Zero" by Hiromi Satō, and the ending theme is "Mezame no Asa" by the voice actresses of the four main heroines (Yui Sakakibara, Mia Naruse, Yura Hinata and Oto Agumi), performing under the name Happiness! Heroines. The opening theme of Happiness! Re:Lucks is "Happi-day♪" by Yui Sakakibara, and the ending theme is "With You..." by Hiromi Satō. The opening theme of Happiness! De:Luxe is "Happiness Hōteishiki" by Yui Sakakibara, and the ending theme is "Ohayō" by Ayumi Murata.

Reception

In a 2007 survey of Dengeki G's Magazine readers, Happiness! ranked 38th in a list of "the most interesting bishōjo games"; a five-way tie with Tokimeki Memorial 2, Tsukihime, Welcome to Pia Carrot G.O. and YU-NO: A girl who chants love at the bound of this world.

References

External links
 Windmill's official website for Happiness! 
 Windmill's official website for Happiness! Re:Lucks 
 Anime official website 
 
 

2005 video games
2006 anime television series debuts
2006 Japanese novels
2006 Japanese television series endings
2006 video games
2007 anime OVAs
Anime television series based on video games
Artland (company)
Bishōjo games
Comedy anime and manga
Cross-dressing in anime and manga
Cross-dressing in television
Cross-dressing in video games
Eroge
Fantasy anime and manga
Japan-exclusive video games
Light novels
Maiden Japan
Manga based on video games
Media Factory manga
PlayStation 2 games
School life in anime and manga
Seinen manga
Video games developed in Japan
Visual novels
Windows games